The 2018 Copa América de Beach Soccer (known natively in Spanish as the Copa América de Futbol Playa) was the second edition of the Copa América de Beach Soccer, an international beach soccer competition in South America, contested between the men's national teams of the members of CONMEBOL.

The competition was organised by South American football's governing body, CONMEBOL; other beach soccer events under the "Copa América" title took place during 1994–99, 2003 and 2012–14, however this incarnation is the first to be officially organised and sanctioned by CONMEBOL.

The tournament was hosted by Peru in the Asia District, around 100 km south of the capital, Lima, between 3 and 10 March. The event was held in cooperation with the local organisers, the Peruvian Football Federation (FPF).

The matches were watched by over 3.5 million people through the FPF's use of Facebook Live to transmit the games worldwide, to the delight of CONMEBOL who claimed the figures demonstrated beach soccer's continued growth under its investment.

Brazil were the defending champions and successfully reclaimed the title, beating Paraguay in the final in what was a repeat of the concluding match in the last edition.

Teams
Teams representing all 10 members of CONMEBOL took part.

Venue

One venue was used in the Asia District, Cañete Province.
A purpose built arena was erected at the Sports Centre of the tourist location, El Boulevard de Asia, hosting all matches, with a capacity of 1,000.

Squads
Each team had to submit a squad of 12 players, including a minimum of two goalkeepers (Regulations Article 4.1).

Draw
The draw to split the ten teams into two groups of five took place on February 15 in the Asia District of Peru at the Centro Deportivo del Boulevard Asia, (Sports Centre of Boulevard Asia).

The teams were seeded based on their final ranking in the previous edition of the Copa América de Beach Soccer in 2016.

Initially, two teams were automatically assigned to the groups:

to Group A: as the hosts, 
to Group B: as the top seeds, 

The remaining eight teams were split into four pots of two based on their seeding, in order from the highest seeds placed in Pot 1, down to the lowest seeds placed in Pot 4. From each pot, one team was drawn into Group A and the other team was drawn into Group B.

Group stage
The top two teams of each group advanced to the semi finals. The teams finishing in third through fifth proceeded to play in consolation matches against the teams finishing in the same position in the other group to determine their final rank.

Each team earns three points for a win in regulation time, two points for a win in extra time, one point for a win in a penalty shoot-out, and no points for a defeat. The rankings of teams in each group are determined as follows (Regulations Article 6.2):

If two or more teams are equal on the basis of the above criterion, their rankings are determined as follows:

Matches are listed as local time in Lima, PET (UTC-5).

Group A

Group B

Placement matches

Ninth place play-off

Seventh place play-off

Fifth place play-off

Knockout stage

Semi-finals

Third place play-off

Final

Awards
The following were presented immediately following the conclusion of the final.

Winners trophy

Individual awards

Top goalscorers
Players with 6 or more goals

15 goals

 Billivardo Velezmoro 
 Daniel Cedeño

12 goals

 Rodrigo

11 goals

 Pedro Moran

9 goals

 Felipe

8 goals

 Andres Laens

7 goals

 Nelito
 Oscar Hurtado
 Mauricio Eiffel
 Carlos Carballo

6 goals

 Jorge Bailón
 Sebastián Vega
 Michael Loor
 Luis Ojeda

Final standings

References

External links
Copa America Futbol Playa Peru 2018, at CONMEBOL.com (in Spanish)
Copa America de Futbol Playa 2018 , at Beach Soccer Worldwide
Copa America 2018 , at Beach Soccer Russia (in Russian)

2018
2018 in Peruvian football
2018
2018 in beach soccer
March 2018 sports events in South America
2018 in South American football